The Vanderkloof Dam (originally the P. K. Le Roux Dam) is situated approximately  downstream from Gariep Dam and is fed by the Orange River, South Africa's largest river. Other rivers flowing into this dam are the Berg River, two unnamed streams coming in from the direction of Reebokrand, the Knapsak River, Paaiskloofspruit, Seekoei River, Kattegatspruit and the Hondeblaf River, in a clockwise direction.

The Town of VanderKloof has been established on the left bank of the dam, with the main town road entrance just up the way from the dam wall, with holiday resorts and parks, such as Rolfontein Nature Reserve (Photos Wiki Commons)

See also 

 List of reservoirs and dams in South Africa

Gallery

References

External links 

 Vanderkloof Dam
 Vanderkloof Power Station on the Eskom-Website

Dams completed in 1977
Energy infrastructure completed in 1977
Orange River
Dams in South Africa
Hydroelectric power stations in South Africa
Buildings and structures in the Northern Cape
20th-century architecture in South Africa